"Shake a Hand" is a 1953 song written by the trumpeter and bandleader Joe Morris and originally recorded by Faye Adams, whose version stayed number one on the U.S. Billboard R&B chart for nine weeks.

Background
The song, which has a strong gospel feel throughout, depicts a reassuring new lover making promises: "Just give me a chance, I'll take care of everything.

Cover versions
Red Foley (number 6 country, 1953)
Johnnie Ray (1956)
Pat Boone (on the 1957 album Pat)
The Mike Pedicin Quintet (number 71 pop, 1958)
Little Richard (on the 1959 album The Fabulous Little Richard)
LaVern Baker (number 13 R&B, 1960)
Jackie Wilson and Linda Hopkins (number 21 R&B, number 42 pop, 1963) 
Freddie Scott (on the 1967 album Are You Lonely for Me?)
Magic Sam (1968, on the posthumous 1993 album Give Me Time)
Elvis Presley (on the 1975 album Today)
Ike & Tina Turner (on the 1985 album Golden Empire)
Lou Ann Barton (on the 1989 album Read My Lips)
Paul McCartney (on the 1999 album Run Devil Run)

References

1953 singles
Faye Adams songs
Red Foley songs
Jackie Wilson songs
LaVern Baker songs
Johnnie Ray songs
Elvis Presley songs
Ike & Tina Turner songs